The Golden Wall is a 1918 American silent comedy drama film directed by Dell Henderson and starring Carlyle Blackwell, Evelyn Greeley and Johnny Hines. It was shot at Fort Lee, New Jersey.

Cast
 Carlyle Blackwell as 	Charles de la Fontaine, Marquis d'Aubeterre
 Evelyn Greeley as 	Marian Lathrop
 Johnny Hines as Frank Lathropp 
 Winifred Leighton as 	Helen d'aubeterre
 Madge Evans as 	Madge Lathroop
 Jack Drumier as 	Mr. Lathrop
 Kate Lester as Countess d'Este
 George MacQuarrie as Rudolph Miller
 Attilio Corbell as 	Monsieur Fremiere 
 Florence Coventry as Mrs. Lathrop
 Louise de Rigney as	Mlle. Julie

References

Bibliography
 Altomara, Rita Ecke. Hollywood on the Palisades: A Filmography of Silent Features Made in Fort Lee, New Jersey, 1903-1927. Garland Pub, 1983. 
 Connelly, Robert B. The Silents: Silent Feature Films, 1910-36, Volume 40, Issue 2. December Press, 1998.
 Munden, Kenneth White. The American Film Institute Catalog of Motion Pictures Produced in the United States, Part 1. University of California Press, 1997.

External links
 

1918 films
1918 comedy films
1910s English-language films
American silent feature films
American black-and-white films
Films directed by Dell Henderson
World Film Company films
1910s American films
Silent American comedy films